The giant sequoia (Sequoiadendron giganteum) is the world's most massive tree, and arguably the largest living organism on Earth. It is neither the tallest extant species of tree (that distinction belongs to the coast redwood), nor is it the widest (that distinction belongs to the baobab tree or Montezuma cypresses), nor is it the longest-lived (that distinction belongs to the Great Basin bristlecone pine).

Giant sequoias grow in well-defined groves in California mixed evergreen forests, along with other old-growth species such as California incense-cedar (Calocedrus decurrens). Because most of the neighboring trees are also quite large, it can be difficult to appreciate the size of an individual giant sequoia. The largest giant sequoias are as tall as a 26-story building, and the width of their bases can exceed that of a city street. This makes them among the fastest growing organisms on Earth, in terms of annual increase in mass.

Distribution

There are 65–75 groves of giant sequoias in the Sierra Nevada, depending upon the criteria used to define a grove. The northernmost of these groves is Placer County Grove in the Tahoe National Forest, Placer County, California, while the southernmost grove is Deer Creek Grove in the Giant Sequoia National Monument, Tulare County, California.

Fire limits growth

Giant sequoias are in many ways adapted to forest fires. Their bark is unusually fire resistant, and their cones will normally open immediately after a fire. However, fire is also the most serious damaging agent of giant sequoias. Seedlings and saplings are highly susceptible to death or serious injury by fire. Larger giant sequoias are more resistant to fire damage, due to their thick protective layer of nonresinous bark and elevated crowns. However, repeated fires over many centuries may penetrate the bark and destroy the vascular cambium. Nearly all of the larger trees have fire scars, many of which cover a large area of the base of the tree. Older trees are rarely killed by fire alone, but the resulting structural damage may predispose a tree to collapse and fire scars also provide entry for fungi which may cause root disease and heart rot. The resulting decayed wood is then more easily consumed by subsequent fires. The result of this cycle is further structural weakening of the tree, which may eventually lead to its collapse.

Fire scars are thought to be the main cause of dead tops. Although lightning strikes rarely kill mature trees, lightning sometimes knocks out large portions of crowns or ignites dead tops. The most common cause of death in mature giant sequoias is toppling, due to weakening of the roots and lower trunk by fire and decay. The extreme weight of the trees coupled with their shallow root systems contributes to this weakening. Other causative factors include wind, water-softened soils, undercutting by streams, and heavy snow loads in the crowns.

The Washington tree, located in the Giant Forest Grove in Sequoia National Park provides a good example of the aforementioned phenomenon. This tree was the second-largest tree in the world (only the General Sherman tree was larger) until September 2003, when the tree lost a portion of its crown as a result of a fire caused by a lightning strike.

Tree measurement
As with other trees, measurement of giant sequoias is conducted using established dendrometric techniques. The most frequent measurements acquired in the field include the height of the tree, the horizontal dimension of its canopy, and its diameter at breast height (DBH). These measurements are then subjected to tree allometry, which employs certain mathematical and statistical principles to estimate the amount of timber volume in a tree.

Calculating the volume of a standing tree is the practical equivalent of calculating the volume of an irregular cone, and is subject to error for various reasons. This is partly due to technical difficulties in measurement, and variations in the shape of trees and their trunks. Measurements of trunk circumference are taken at only a few predetermined heights up the trunk, and assume that the trunk is circular in cross-section, and that taper between measurement points is even. Also, only the volume of the trunk (including the restored volume of basal fire scars) is taken into account, and not the volume of wood in the branches or roots. The volume measurements also do not take cavities into account. For example, while studying sequoia tree canopies in 1999, researchers discovered that the Washington tree in Giant Forest Grove was largely hollow.

List of largest giant sequoias by trunk volume
The following table is a list of the largest giant sequoias, all of which are located in California. The table is sorted by trunk volume, ignoring wood in the branches of the tree.

 indicates a giant sequoia that sustained heavy fire damage after its most recent volume estimate.

Notes
 The trees Named "Franklin", "Column", "Monroe", "Hamilton" and "Adams" were named by Wendell Flint and others. These five are now included on the official map of Giant Forest, where they are all situated.
 The Hazelwood Tree (not listed above) had a volume of  before losing half its trunk in a lightning storm in 2002, if it were still at full size it would currently be the 17th largest giant sequoia on earth.
 The largest giant sequoia killed at the hand of man was Mother of the Forest or the General Noble Tree in 1892, about the same volume as the Boole Tree.

The nine largest trees

See also

 General Noble Tree
 List of giant sequoia groves
 Mother of the Forest
 National Register of Big Trees
 List of individual trees
 List of oldest trees 
 List of superlative trees
 The House (trees)

Notes

References

Further reading

External links

 
Sequoiadendron
Sequoiadendron
Giant sequoias, Largest
Sequoiadendron
Sequoiadendron
Giant sequoias, Largest
Sequoias
Giant sequoias